Saubrigues is a commune in the Landes department in Nouvelle-Aquitaine in southwestern France.

Population

Transportation
The closest airport to Saubrigues is Biarritz Airport (23 km).

See also
Communes of the Landes department

References

Communes of Landes (department)